Lauring is a Danish surname. Notable people with the surname include:

Gunnar Lauring (1905–1968), Danish actor
Bertel Lauring (1928–2000), Danish actor
Kolbein Lauring (1914–1987), Norwegian resistance member

See also
Laurin

Danish-language surnames